Thomas Ball (1590–1659) was an English divine. He wrote only one book, Ποιμηνόπυργος — Pastorum Propugnaculum, or the Pulpit's Patronage against the Force of Unordained Usurpation and Invasion (London, 1656).

Life
Ball was born at Aberbury in Shropshire. While still young he was appointed usher in the then famous school of Mr. Puller, at Epping, in Essex, where he stayed for two years. Then he entered Queens' College, Cambridge in 1615. He proceeded M.A. in 1625. He was received by John Preston as a pupil as recommended by Puller; when Preston became master of Emmanuel College, he took Ball along with him from Queens'.

Ball obtained a fellowship, and had a large group of pupils; his exercises and sermons at St. Mary's gained him  distinction as a preacher. He accepted  a call to the church of Northampton about 1630, and conducted the weekly lecture there for about twenty-seven years. When the plague came to the town, he remained and ministered.

He was three times married, and had a large family. He died, aged sixty-nine, in 1659, and was buried 21 June. His funeral sermon was preached by his neighbour, John Howes; it was published under the title of Real Comforts, and included notes on his life.

Works
Ball printed only one book, Ποιμηνόπυργος — Pastorum Propugnaculum, or the Pulpit's Patronage against the Force of Unordained Usurpation and Invasion. (London, 1656). This is full of out-of-the-way learning. Pastorum Propugnaculum is a defence of the church of England: it vindicates the reasonableness and scripturalness of 'ordination' and of adequate learning; but states the objections of opponents.

Ball, with Thomas Goodwin, also edited and published the numerous posthumous works of his friend John Preston.

References

Attribution

1590 births
1659 deaths
Clergy from Shropshire
17th-century English Anglican priests
Masters of Emmanuel College, Cambridge
Alumni of Queens' College, Cambridge
16th-century Anglican theologians
17th-century Anglican theologians